Kwuanfah Inchareon (born 20 April 1976) is a Thai sprinter. She competed in the women's 4 × 100 metres relay at the 1996 Summer Olympics.

References

External links
 

1976 births
Living people
Athletes (track and field) at the 1996 Summer Olympics
Kwuanfah Inchareon
Kwuanfah Inchareon
Place of birth missing (living people)
Asian Games medalists in athletics (track and field)
Kwuanfah Inchareon
Athletes (track and field) at the 1994 Asian Games
Medalists at the 1994 Asian Games
Olympic female sprinters
Kwuanfah Inchareon
Kwuanfah Inchareon